The men's tournament of Water polo at the 2016 European Universities Games at Rijeka, Croatia, ran from July 12 until July 16, 2016. Games were held at the Kantrida polls.

Group stage

Group A

Universities Games
European Universities Games